WDUN-FM (102.9 MHz) is a radio station  broadcasting a news/talk format. Licensed to Clarkesville, Georgia, the station serves the Northeastern Georgia area. The station is currently owned by JWJ Properties, Inc., doing business as Jacobs Media Corporation, which also operates WDUN (AM) in Gainesville, Georgia.

History
The station signed on the air January 9, 1990 as WCHM, and less than a month later became WMJE 102.9FM, "Majic 103FM", with a soft AC format. The station changed format to Contemporary hit radio in 1997, to Hot Adult Contemporary in 2000, to Oldies in 2003, all the while retaining the "Majic" branding.  The station changed to "Kool FM" for a short time before dropping its music programming altogether in 2010.

WMJE dropped its music programming on October 4, 2010, and became News/Talk 102.9 WDUN-FM, partially simulcasting sister station News/Talk AM 550 WDUN.

According to FCC records, WDUN-FM had one repeater station, W300BF 107.9 MHz in Commerce, Georgia, owned by Athens Christian Radio, Inc. The repeater callsign has now been removed from the FCC  FM Query website.

Sports programming
WDUN-FM airs the Gwinnett Braves Radio Network and the Gwinnett Gladiators, as well as Georgia Southern Eagles and the Atlanta Falcons (with which WMJE was affiliated prior to the format change). The station also carries some local high school sports live, including Gainesville High School.

References

External links

DUN-FM
Radio stations established in 1990